Giacomo Zani (9 July 1932 – 17 June 2021) was an Italian conductor and musicologist.

References

1932 births
2021 deaths
20th-century Italian conductors (music)
People from Casalmaggiore
20th-century Italian musicologists
21st-century Italian conductors (music)
21st-century musicologists
Italian male conductors (music)
20th-century Italian male musicians
21st-century Italian male musicians